Oak Plain Presbyterian Church is a historic Presbyterian church located near Waycross, Sampson County, North Carolina.   It was built in 1859, and is a one-story, three-bay-by-three bay, temple form, Greek Revival style frame church. A steeple was added to the church building in 1976. Also on the property is the contributing church cemetery.

It was added to the National Register of Historic Places in 1986.

References

External links
Church info

Presbyterian churches in North Carolina
Churches on the National Register of Historic Places in North Carolina
Greek Revival church buildings in North Carolina
Churches completed in 1859
19th-century Presbyterian church buildings in the United States
Churches in Sampson County, North Carolina
National Register of Historic Places in Sampson County, North Carolina
Wooden churches in North Carolina